Exodus Savings and Credit Cooperative Society Limited, also referred to as Exodus Sacco, is a savings and credit co-operative society in Uganda. It is an institutional Sacco, composed of Uganda Police Force (UPF) personnel and their families.

Overview
, it had total assets in excess of UGX:7 billion, with approximately 21,500 members. Membership is restricted to those in active service with the UP and members of their families. The main objective is to mobilize savings from members and make loans to members at reasonable interest rates to improve their welfare. Exodus Sacco is the second-largest security forces-related Sacco in Uganda, behind the much bigger Wazalendo Savings and Credit Cooperative Society. As of December 2019, membership in Exodus Sacco had risen to over 30,000, and total assets were valued in excess of USh20 billion (US$5.5 million).

There is another Uganda Police Sacco called Police Savings Association Limited, which was started in 1989, and the two Saccos compete for members.

History
The Sacco was formed in Kampala, in 2007, to be operated by members of the Uganda Police Force, for the benefit of members of the UPF and their families. The concept was introduced to police units in other areas of the country, with mixed success.

Branch network
Masaka Branch 
Mbarara Branch
Kabale Branch
Fort-Portal Branch
Hoima Branch
Kabalye PTS Branch
Arua Branch
Gulu Branch
Lira Branch
Soroti Branch
Moroto Branch
Iganga Branch
Mbale Branch

Governance
As of August 2019, Exodus Sacco was governed by a nine-member executive committee, chaired by ASP Kalulu Henry.
In December 2019, elections were conducted and Senior Commissioner of Police (SCP) Dr. Omoding Wilson was elected Board Chairperson.
Also elected among others, was Senior Commissioner of Police (SCP) Namutebi Hadijja as Chaiperson Supervisory Committee. 
All these went through a Vetting process under the leadership of Superintendent of Police (SP) Muwonge Abel as Chairperson VetCo.

See also
Banking in Uganda
Economy of Uganda

References

External links
  Kayihura Wants Cops To Belong To SACCOs
  Police Response To Mr. Karugaba's Article

Banks established in 2007
2007 establishments in Uganda
Kampala District
Credit unions of Uganda